Pleitrange (Luxembourgish: Plaitreng) is a rural hamlet and farm in the commune of Contern in Luxembourg. It is often also called Pleitangerhaff, or Pleitranger Hof. It is elevated approximately 295 metres above sea level. Pleitrange is located on a hill, some water flows down from Pleitrange to the Syre, but most water flows to the Houlbech and the Bauschbaach.. There are 2 areas of buildings that make up Pleitrange. One is on the main road between Oetrange and Bous. The speed limit on the road is reduced from 90km/h to 70km/h when entering the town. Pleitrange is also the junction between this road and a small trail appropriately named Rue de Pleitrange. Running south this trail runs to Moutfort eventually hitting the E29 main road. Northbound it goes to the actual farm in Pleitrange and passes a small pond which is the source of the Bauschbaach. The road ends shortly after the farm. South of Pleitrange the road splits in Twain with another train going to another part of Moutfort.

References 

Villages in Luxembourg